The Icelandic men's second division 2017 football season was the 52nd season of third-tier football in Iceland. Twelve teams contested the league. Play began on 6 May and concluded on 23 September.

Teams
The league was contested by twelve clubs, eight of which played in the division during the 2016 season. There were four new clubs from the previous campaign:
Huginn and Fjarðabyggð were relegated from the 2016 1. deild karla, replacing ÍR and Grótta who were promoted to the 2017 1. deild karla
Tindastóll and Víðir were promoted from the 2016 3. deild karla, in place of Ægir and KF who were relegated to the 2017 3. deild karla

Club information

League table

Results
Each team plays every opponent once home and away for a total of 22 matches per club, and 132 matches altogether.

Top goalscorers

References

2. deild karla seasons
Iceland
Iceland
3